Pyotr Mikhaylovich Yershov (1910–1994) was a Soviet theater director and art theoretician, most famous for his textbooks on directing and works on Stanislavski's system.

He wrote Directing as a Practical Psychology, with forewords by Oleg Yefremov and P.V. Simonov, 1972, and Technology of an Actor in 1959, that is often recommended course material in Russian and American theater schools.

External links
 Biography and photos
 Full bibliography of Pyotr Mikhailovich Yershov's works

Soviet theatre directors
Soviet essayists
1910 births
1994 deaths